Mario Titone (born 14 October 1988) is an Italian footballer, who currently plays as a forward for U.S.D. Recanatese 1923.

Club career
Born in Erice, Sicily, Titone started his professional career with Tuscany club Sansovino. After played once for Sansovino in 2006–07 Coppa Italia, he was signed by Serie C1 club Pisa and spent 2 seasons with its Primavera team. After Pisa went bankrupt, he was signed by Serie B club Sassuolo and farmed to Lega Pro Prima Divisione club Sambenedettese in co-ownership deal. On 26 June 2009, Sambenedettese bought him outright after winning the closed tender regarding the remain 50% registration rights between the two clubs. However, in July 2009, Sassuolo re-signed Titone after Sambenedettese went bankrupt.

On 18 January 2011 Titone left for Lanciano in temporary deal with option to purchase. Titone missed the whole second half of 2011–12 Lega Pro Prima Divisione, except the promotion playoffs.
After a short experience with FC Ceahlăul Piatra Neamț (Romanian Liga I) he signs for A.S. Bisceglie Calcio 1913 (Italian Serie D).

International career

Representative teams
Titone played once for the Italy U20 Lega Pro team against Hungary in 2008–09 Mirop Cup. He won the annual Lega Pro Prima Divisione Trophy with U21 representative team of Group A and won Trofeo Dossena with U20 Lega Pro representative team in June 2009.

During the 2009–10 season, he played once for Italy under-21 Serie B representative team in internal training match.

References

External links
 La Gazzetta dello Sport Profile 
 La Gazzetta dello Sport Profile (2007–08 season) 
 Football.it Profile 
 
 

1988 births
Living people
People from Erice
Italian footballers
Association football forwards
A.C. Sansovino players
Pisa S.C. players
A.S. Sambenedettese players
U.S. Sassuolo Calcio players
CSM Ceahlăul Piatra Neamț players
S.S. Virtus Lanciano 1924 players
A.S. Bisceglie Calcio 1913 players
A.C.N. Siena 1904 players
Piacenza Calcio 1919 players
Imolese Calcio 1919 players
Serie B players
Serie C players
Serie D players
Liga I players
Italian expatriate footballers
Expatriate footballers in Romania
Italian expatriate sportspeople in Romania
Footballers from Sicily
Sportspeople from the Province of Trapani